Leiocephalus vinculum, commonly known as the Gonave curlytail or Cochran's curlytail lizard , is a species of lizard in the family Leiocephalidae (curly-tailed lizard). It is native to Haiti.

References

Leiocephalus
Reptiles described in 1928
Reptiles of Haiti
Taxa named by Doris Mable Cochran